USS Chatham is a name used more than once by the U.S. Navy:

 , an iron side wheel steamer was built in 1836.
  was launched in 1916 by Maryland Steel Company, Sparrows Point, Maryland.
 , was transferred to the United Kingdom 11 August 1943 under lend-lease and renamed HMS Slinger.
  was launched 13 May 1944 by Froemming Brothers, Milwaukee, Wisconsin.

United States Navy ship names